Steven Kane (born 5 June 1980) is a British  racing driver who currently competes in the Blancpain Endurance Series and Avon Tyres British GT Championship for M-Sport Bentley driving a Bentley Continental GT3.

Career
Kane, who was born in Newtownards, County Down and grow up in Ballynahinch, was voted McLaren Autosport BRDC Young Driver of the Year in 2001 (earning a test with the McLaren Formula One team), after winning the Junior Formula Ford Zetec championship by taking 8 wins and 4 runners-up spots in 12 races. From 2003 to 2005 he competed in Formula Three; finishing as runner-up in the Scholarship class (for year-old cars) of the 2003 British Formula 3 Championship, finishing 3rd overall in Spain in 2004, and in 2005 he was 9th in the main British F3 championship. That year he took 3 poles and a win, despite the deal only coming together a day before the season began. At the end of 2005 he became the first driver ever to race a Lola at the Macau Formula Three race. He then raced in the Formula Renault 3.5 Series, with a best result of 2nd.

For 2007 he moved into the Porsche Carrera Cup GB, finishing 3rd overall and fighting for the title until the final round, with a series-high seven wins, including pole position at Thruxton.

In 2008 he competed in the BTCC, driving a BMW for the Motorbase Performance team. He started the year strongly, finishing 8th on his debut and later taking a 6th place at Rockingham Motor Speedway after a tough weekend. At Croft he ran 4th for a while, but dropped out with an electrical problem on the final lap. His first podium finish came at the next meeting at Snetterton. At the next meeting at Oulton Park, he qualified 15th before advancing to 9th in race 1, and from 9th on the grid to 4th in race 2, before being eliminated from race 3 after a first-lap hit from Tom Chilton.

He did not return to the BTCC for 2009. He is the series test driver for the new FIA Formula Two Championship, and co-commentator alongside Martin Haven on Eurosport2's coverage of the championship.

On 26 September 2009 he was a guest driver in the Kumho BMW Championship at Oulton Park. He qualified first in both qualifying sessions, and won both races. He was later punished with two points on his racing license after he was deemed by the stewards to have taken out another competitor on purpose.

Kane returned to the BTCC with the Airwaves BMW team for the 2010 season, partnering Mat Jackson. Kane won his first BTCC race at Thruxton on 4 April 2010 when he completed a one-two for Airwaves BMW in race three. He finished sixth overall at the end of the 2010 season with 169 points.

On 15 June 2011, it was announced that Kane would pilot a Lola-Mazda prototype for Dyson Racing in the American Le Mans Series, partnering with Humaid al-Masaood. He and al-Masaood finished 3rd overall (and 3rd in the LMP1 class) in each of their first two ALMS events at Lime Rock Park and Mosport. Kane and al-Masaood claimed their first overall victory at the inaugural Baltimore Grand Prix.

For 2012, Kane will race with Humaid al-Masaood in the Oryx Racing's Audi R8 GRAND-AM program in the Rolex Sports Car Series. In addition to this, Kane will also compete at the 12 Hours of Sebring with the Dyson Racing team.

Kane switched from racing in North America to Europe in 2013, joining JRM Racing to campaign a Nissan GT-R in the Blancpain Endurance Series alongside Peter Dumbreck and Lucas Luhr. Kane and Dumbreck finished eighth in the series' Pro Cup standings.

Kane has joined M-Sport for 2014, driving a Bentley Continental GT3 alongside Humaid Al Masaood in the British GT Championship, and with Guy Smith and Andy Meyrick in the Blancpain Endurance Series, after scoring a 4th place with the team at the 2013 Abu Dhabi Gulf 12 Hours.

2014 started brightly for Kane as he and his team mates Guy Smith and Andy Meyrick took a fourth place at Monza in April, followed by a home win at Silverstone in late May. A further victory came at the end of June at Paul Ricard which ultimately ensured a runners-up position in the final Blancpain Endurance Series standings.

For 2015 Kane stays with Bentley. His season started well with fourth-place finishes at both the Bathurst 12 Hours in February and the opening Monza Blancpain race in April.

Racing record

Career summary

Complete Formula Renault 3.5 Series results
(key) (Races in bold indicate pole position) (Races in italics indicate fastest lap)

† Driver did not finish the race, but was classified as he completed more than 90% of the race distance.

Complete Porsche Supercup results
(key) (Races in bold indicate pole position) (Races in italics indicate fastest lap)

† Guest driver – Not eligible for points.

Complete British Touring Car Championship results
(key) (Races in bold indicate pole position – 1 point awarded in first race) (Races in italics indicate fastest lap – 1 point awarded all races) (* signifies that driver lead race for at least one lap – 1 point given all races)

References

External links
 
Career statistics from Driver Database
Profile at BTCCPages.com

1980 births
Living people
Racing drivers from Northern Ireland
Formula Ford drivers
British Touring Car Championship drivers
British Formula Renault 2.0 drivers
British Formula Three Championship drivers
Euroformula Open Championship drivers
World Series Formula V8 3.5 drivers
British GT Championship drivers
24 Hours of Daytona drivers
Rolex Sports Car Series drivers
Porsche Supercup drivers
Blancpain Endurance Series drivers
ADAC GT Masters drivers
24 Hours of Spa drivers
Porsche Carrera Cup GB drivers
T-Sport drivers
Epsilon Euskadi drivers
Abt Sportsline drivers
Nürburgring 24 Hours drivers
Racing Engineering drivers
OAK Racing drivers
M-Sport drivers